Tom Edward Pawley (21 January 1859 – 3 August 1923) was an English first-class cricketer active 1880–87 who played for Kent County Cricket Club. He was born in Farningham and died in Canterbury.

References

1859 births
1923 deaths
English cricketers
Kent cricketers
People from Farningham